The repatriation and reburial of human remains is a current issue in archaeology and museum management, centering on ethical issues and cultural sensitivities regarding human remains of long-deceased ancestors which have ended up in museums and other institutions. Historical trauma as a result of colonialism is often involved. Various indigenous peoples around the world, such as Native Americans and Indigenous Australians, have requested that human remains from their respective communities be repatriated to their local areas and burial sites from various institutions, often in other countries, for reburial.

Several requests for repatriation have developed into controversies which sometimes involve court cases, such as the Kennewick Man in the United States. The modern druids' request for the reburial of ancient human remains in the British Isles raised much debate. There is an ongoing program by the Australian government supporting the repatriation of Indigenous peoples' remains from institutions around the world.

Ethical considerations 
The controversy of Archaeological ethics arises from the fact that some believe that it is disrespectful to the dead and to their contemporary descendants for their remains to be displayed in a museum or stored in other ways.

Historical trauma 
According to Hubert and Fforde (2002), the first and foremost undercurrent of repatriation is the ill-treatment of people in the past, the repatriation of human remains being to a degree part of a healing process aimed at repairing some of the traumas of history. It is important that this ill-treatment is addressed, but with the repatriation and reburial of remains, they are essentially lost to the world as a reminder of that part of the history or biography of those remains. Repatriation presents an opportunity for people to lay claim to their own past and actively decide what is and what is not a part of their cultural heritage. The basis for the treatment of remains as objects for display and study in museums was that the people were seen as sufficiently "other" that they could be studied without any ethical considerations.

The contesting of ownership of human remains and demands of return to cultural groups is largely fuelled by the difference in the handling of "white" and indigenous remains. Where the former were reburied, the latter were subjects of study, eventually ending up in museums. In a sense one cultural group assumed the right to carry out scientific research upon another cultural group This disrespectful and unequal treatment stems from a time when race and cultural differences had huge social implications, and centuries of inequality cannot be easily corrected. Repatriation and ownership claims have increased in recent years. The “traumas of history” can be addressed by reconciliation, repatriation and formal governmental apologies disapproving of conducts in the past by the institutions they now represent.

A good example of a repatriation case is described by Thornton, where a large group of massacred Northern Cheyenne Native Americans were returned to their tribe, showing the healing power of the repatriation gesture.

Health considerations
Some of the remains were preserved with pesticides that are now known to be harmful to human health.

Australia

Indigenous Australians' remains were removed from graves, burial sites, hospitals, asylums and prisons from the 19th century through to the late 1940s. Most of those which ended up in other countries are in the United Kingdom, with many also in Germany, France and other European countries as well as in the US. Official figures do not reflect the true state of affairs, with many in private collections and small museums. More than 10,000 corpses or part-corpses were probably taken to the UK alone.

Australia has no laws directly governing repatriation, but there is a government programme relating to the return of Aboriginal remains, the International Repatriation Program (IRP), administered by the Department of Communications and the Arts. This programme "supports the repatriation of ancestral remains and secret sacred objects to their communities of origin to help promote healing and reconciliation" and assists community representatives work towards repatriation of remains in various ways.

, it was estimated that around 1,500 Aboriginal and Torres Strait Islander ancestral remains had been returned to Australia in the previous 30 years. The government website showed that  over 2,500 ancestral remains had been returned to their community of origin.

The Queensland Museum's program of returning and reburying ancestral remains which had been collected by the museum between 1870 and 1970 has been under way since the 1970s. As of November 2018, the museum had the remains of 660 Aboriginal and Torres Strait Islander people stored in their "secret sacred room" on the fifth floor.

In March 2019, 37 sets of Australian Aboriginal ancestral remains were set to be returned, after the Natural History Museum in London officially gave back the remains by means of a solemn ceremony. The remains would be looked after by the South Australian Museum and the National Museum of Australia until such time as reburial can take place.

In April 2019, work began to return more than 50 ancestral remains from five different German institutes, starting with a ceremony at the Five Continents Museum in Munich.

The South Australian Museum reported in April 2019 that it had more than 4,600 Old People in storage, awaiting reburial. Whilst many remains had been shipped overseas by its 1890s director Edward C. Stirling, many more were the result of land clearing, construction projects or members of the public. With a recent change in policy at the museum, a dedicated Repatriation Officer will implement a program of repatriation.

In April 2019, the skeletons of 14 Yawuru and Karajarri people which had been sold by a wealthy Broome pastoralist and pearler to a museum in Dresden in 1894 were brought home to Broome, in Western Australia. The remains, which had been stored in the Grassi Museum of Ethnology in Leipzig, showed signs of head wounds and malnutrition, a reflection of the poor conditions endured by Aboriginal people forced to work on the pearling boats in the 19th century. The Yawuru and Karajarri people are still in negotiations with the Natural History Museum in London to enable the release of the skull of the warrior known as Gwarinman.

On 1 August 2019, the remains of 11 Kaurna people which had been returned from the UK were laid to rest at a ceremony led by elder Jeffrey Newchurch at Kingston Park Coastal Reserve, south of the city of Adelaide.

In March 2020, a documentary titled Returning Our Ancestors was released by the Victorian Aboriginal Heritage Council based on the book Power and the Passion: Our Ancestors Return Home (2010) by Shannon Faulkhead and Uncle Jim Berg, partly narrated by award-winning musician Archie Roach. It was developed primarily as a resource for secondary schools in the state of Victoria, to help develop an understanding of Aboriginal history and culture by explaining the importance of ancestral remains.

In November 2021, the South Australian Museum apologised to the Kaurna people for having taken their ancestors' remains, and buried 100 of them
a new  site at Smithfield Memorial Park, donated by Adelaide Cemeteries. The memorial site is in the shape of the Kaurna shield, to protect the ancestors now buried there.

France 
During the French colonisation of Algeria, 24 Algerians fought the colonial forces in 1830 and in an 1849 revolt. They were decapitated and their skulls were taken to France as trophies. In 2011, Ali Farid Belkadi, an Algerian historian, discovered the skulls at the Museum of Man in Paris and alerted Algerian authorities that consequently launched the formal repatriation request, the skulls were returned in 2020. Between the remains were those of revolt leader Sheikh Bouzian, who was captured in 1849 by the French, shot and decapitated, and the skull of resistance leader Mohammed Lamjad ben Abdelmalek, also known as Cherif Boubaghla (the man with the mule).

Ireland
The British anthropologist Alfred Cort Haddon removed 13 skulls from a graveyard on Inishmore, and more skulls from Inishbofin, County Galway, and a graveyard in Ballinskelligs, County Kerry, as part of the Victorian-era study of "racial types". The skulls are still in storage at Trinity College Dublin and their return to the cemeteries of origin has been requested, and the board of Trinity College has signalled its willingness to work with islanders to return the remains to the island.

On 24 February 2023, Trinity College Dublin confirmed that the human remains, including 13 skulls, in their possession would be returned to Inishbofin.

United Kingdom
The skeleton of the "Irish Giant" Charles Byrne (1761–1783) was on public display in the Hunterian Museum, Glasgow despite it being Byrne's express wish to be buried at sea. Author Hilary Mantel called in 2020 for his remains to be returned to Ireland. It was removed from public display as part of redevelopment work in the late 2010s early 2020s although Byrne’s skeleton was retained in the museum collection to allow for future research.

Druids

The Neo-druidic movement is a modern religion, with some groups originating in the 18th century and others in the 20th century. They are generally inspired by either Victorian-era ideas of the druids of the Iron Age, or later neopagan movements. Some practice ancestor veneration, and because of this may believe that they have a responsibility to care for the ancient dead where they now live. In 2006 Paul Davies requested that the Alexander Keiller Museum in Avebury, Wiltshire rebury their Neolithic human remains, and that storing and displaying them was "immoral and disrespectful". The National Trust refused to allow reburial, but did allow for Neo-druids to perform a healing ritual in the museum.

The archaeological community has voiced criticism of the Neo-druids, making statements such as "no single modern ethnic group or cult should be allowed to appropriate our ancestors for their own agendas. It is for the international scientific community to curate such remains." An argument proposed by archaeologists is that: 

Mr. Davies thanked English Heritage for their time and commitment given to the whole process and concluded that the dialogue used within the consultation focussed on museum retention and not reburial as requested.

United States

The Native American Graves Protection and Repatriation Act (NAGPRA), passed in 1990, provides a process for museums and federal agencies to return certain cultural items such as human remains, funerary objects, sacred objects, etc. to lineal descendants and culturally affiliated Indian tribes and Native Hawaiian organisations.

Kennewick Man
The Kennewick Man is the name generally given to the skeletal remains of a prehistoric Paleoamerican man found on a bank of the Columbia River in Kennewick, Washington, United States, on 28 July 1996, which became the subject of a controversial nine-year court case between the United States Army Corps of Engineers, scientists, the Umatilla people and other Native American tribes who claimed ownership of the remains.

The remains of Kennewick Man were finally removed from the Burke Museum of Natural History and Culture on 17 February 2017. The following day, more than 200 members of five Columbia Plateau tribes were present at a burial of the remains.

See also
Repatriation (cultural heritage)

References

Cited works

Further reading

Aboriginal remains repatriation (Australia)
 Book reviews of Scarre & Scarre and Vitelli and Colwell

Neo-druidism
Cultural heritage
Art and culture law
Indigenous rights
Archaeology of death
Archaeological collections
Archaeological controversies